"Sexy" is a moderately successful hit recorded by Klymaxx for the MCA label. Produced and written by Bernadette Cooper with George Clinton, the song was recorded and released as the second single from their fifth album, Klymaxx. The song reached number 18 on the Billboard Black Singles Chart.

Credits
Lead vocals Lorena Porter, Bernadette Cooper and Lynn Malsby
Background vocals by Klymaxx

References

1986 singles
Klymaxx songs
1986 songs
MCA Records singles